Veselin Nedelchev Branev (28 April 1932 - 21 February 2014) was a Bulgarian film director, screenwriter, film critic and writer.

Life and career 
The brother of the director , Branev graduated in law at the Sofia University, and then studied  film directing in Berlin. From 1957 he was active as a screenwriter at Boyana Film, and in 1983 he made his directorial film debut with Hotel Central, which was entered into the competition at the 40th Venice International Film Festival to large critical acclaim.

In 1997 he moved to Canada, where he mainly focused on his literary activity. His 2007 semi-autobiographical novel Sledeniyat chovek (Следеният човек, "The tracked man"),  raised a critical stir and large controversies in his home country.

During his life he was the recipient of several awards and accolades, including  the Order of Saints Cyril and Methodius, and the Golden Rose Award. He died on 21 February 2014, at the age of 81.

References

External links
 

1932 births
2014 deaths
Soviet writers
Bulgarian writers
Soviet film directors
Bulgarian film directors
People from Sofia
Sofia University alumni